Edgar William Elliot (9 July 1878 – 23 March 1931) was an English cricketer and rugby union player.  In cricket, Elliot was a right-handed batsman who bowled right-arm medium fast, while in rugby union he played on the wing.  He was born in Roker, County Durham and died in Vancouver, British Columbia, Canada on 23 March 1931.

Cricket
Elliot made his debut for Durham in the 1897 Minor Counties Championship against Northumberland.  He played Minor counties cricket for Durham from 1897 to 1907, making 76 Minor Counties Championship appearances.  He captained Durham from 1903 to 1906.  During his career he played two first-class matches.  The first of these came for the Gentlemen of England against Cambridge University.  In this match, he scored 5 runs in the Gentlemen's first-innings, before being dismissed by Guy Napier.  He second first-class match came days after his appearance for the Gentlemen of England, with Elliot appearing HDG Leveson-Gower's XI against Oxford University.  In this match, he scored 15 runs before being dismissed by Humphrey Gilbert, while in their second-innings he ended unbeaten on 10, with the match ending in a draw.

Rugby union
Elliot played his club rugby for Sunderland and became the team's most capped player, after representing England four times in the Home Nations Championship between 1901 and 1904. He scored two international tries, both coming in his final game, a 14 all draw against Wales during the 1904 Home Nations Championship. As well as Sunderland, Elliot also played county rugby for Durham and played for invitational touring team the Barbarians. His uncle, Charles Henry Elliot, also played rugby for Sunderland and was capped once for England in 1886.

References

External links
Edgar Elliot at ESPNcricinfo
Edgar Elliot at CricketArchive
Edgar Elliot at ESPNscrum

1878 births
1931 deaths
People from County Durham (before 1974)
Cricketers from Tyne and Wear
Rugby union players from Tyne and Wear
People educated at Wellington College, Berkshire
English cricketers
Durham cricketers
Durham cricket captains
English rugby union players
England international rugby union players
Barbarian F.C. players
Rugby union wings
Gentlemen of England cricketers
H. D. G. Leveson Gower's XI cricketers
Rugby union players from Sunderland